Sue Owen may refer to:

 Sue Owen (civil servant) (born 1955), British former civil servant, economist and academic
 Sue Owen (poet) (born 1942), American poet